In mathematics, a Grassmannian may refer to:

Affine Grassmannian
Affine Grassmannian (manifold)
Grassmannian, the classical parameter space for linear subspaces of a linear space or projective space
Lagrangian Grassmannian

See also 
 Grassmann algebra, or exterior algebra, a setting where the exterior product is defined.
 Grassmann number, a construction for path integrals of fermionic fields in physics.
 Grassmann integral, a method for integrating functions of Grassmann variables